Bandaru Madhava Naidu is an Indian politician. He was elected in the 2014 Andhra Pradesh Legislative Assembly election as an MLA of Narasapuram (Assembly constituency), representing Telugu Desam Party.

References

Telugu politicians
Andhra Pradesh MLAs 2014–2019
Telugu Desam Party politicians
Living people
Year of birth missing (living people)
Indian Hindus
People from West Godavari district